Samuel Henne Addae is a Ghanaian politician and was a member of the first parliament of the second Republic of Ghana. He represented Brekum constituency under the membership of the Progress Party (PP).

Early life and education 
Addae was born on 15 February 1929. He attended Achimota Training College and University of Ghana where he obtained a Teachers' Training Certificate and Bachelor of Arts respectively. He later worked as a Teacher before going to serve at the Parliament of Ghana.

Politics 
Addae began his political career in 1969 when he became the parliamentary candidate for the Progress Party (PP) to represent his constituency in the Parliament of Ghana prior to the commencement of the 1969 Ghanaian parliamentary election.

He was sworn into the First Parliament of the Second Republic of Ghana on 1 October 1969, after being pronounced winner at the 1969 Ghanaian election held on 26 August 1969 and his tenure of office ended on 13 January 1972.

Personal life 
He is a Christian.

References 

Progress Party (Ghana) politicians
1929 births
Possibly living people
University of Ghana alumni
People from Berekum
Ghanaian MPs 1969–1972